Young Europe was an international political association founded in 1834 by Giuseppe Mazzini on the model of Young Italy. It was composed of the national societies of Young Italy, Young Poland and Young Germany, which, independent in their own sphere, acted in common, through a central committee, for the furthering of the principles of liberty, equality, and humanity in Europe. The headquarters of the society were in Switzerland, where, in 1835–36, was brought about the organization of a French society, Young France. The activity of the society speedily aroused the opposition of the Swiss authorities, who expelled many of its members from the country.

"In the Spring of 1834, while at Berne, Mazzini and a dozen refugees from Italy, Poland and Germany founded a new association with the grandiose name of Young Europe. Its basic, and equally grandiose idea, was that, as the French Revolution of 1789 had enlarged the concept of individual liberty, another revolution would now be needed for national liberty; and his vision went further because he hoped that in the no doubt distant future free nations might combine to form a loosely federal Europe with some kind of federal assembly to regulate their common interests. [...] His intention was nothing less than to overturn the European settlement agreed in 1815 by the Congress of Vienna, which had reestablished an oppressive hegemony of a few great powers and blocked the emergence of smaller nations. [...] Mazzini hoped, but without much confidence, that his vision of a league or society of independent nations would be realized in his own lifetime. In practice Young Europe lacked the money and popular support for more than a short-term existence. Nevertheless he always remained faithful to the ideal of a united continent for which the creation of individual nations would be an indispensable preliminary."

References

External links
 

1834 establishments in Europe
1836 disestablishments in Europe
Liberalism in Europe
Political internationals
Political organisations based in Switzerland